Inanidrilus gustavsoni is a species of annelid worm. It is known from subtidal coral sands in the Bellairs Reef, Barbados, in the Atlantic Ocean. It measures  in length.

References

gustavsoni
Fauna of Barbados
Taxa named by Christer Erséus
Fauna of the Atlantic Ocean
Animals described in 1984